Guy Coleman (born 26 June 1974) is a New Zealand former cricketer and coach. He played three List A matches for Auckland in 2001/02. Coleman also played for Grafton United Cricket Club, scoring more than 4,600 runs and taking more than 400 wickets for the team, in a career spanning twenty years.

See also
 List of Auckland representative cricketers

References

External links
 

1974 births
Living people
New Zealand cricketers
Auckland cricketers
Cricketers from Auckland